San Giorgio La Molara is a comune (municipality) in the Province of Benevento in the Italian region Campania, located about 70 km northeast of Naples and about 20 km northeast of Benevento.

San Giorgio La Molara borders the following municipalities: Buonalbergo, Casalbore, Foiano di Val Fortore, Ginestra degli Schiavoni, Molinara, Montefalcone di Val Fortore, Paduli, Pago Veiano, San Marco dei Cavoti.
Many inhabitants of San Giorgio La Molara emigrated to South Australia after the Second World War due to the lack of employment opportunities in Southern Italy in the post-war period.

Notable people
 

Ernesto Solitario (born 1838), sculptor

References

External links
 Official website